Baisden is an unincorporated community in Mingo County, West Virginia, United States. Baisden has a post office with ZIP code 25608.

References

Unincorporated communities in Mingo County, West Virginia
Unincorporated communities in West Virginia